The Roman Catholic Diocese of Nezahualcóyotl (erected 5 February 1979) is a suffragan diocese of the Archdiocese of Tlalnepantla.

Ordinaries
José Melgoza Osorio (1979 - 1989)
José María Hernández González (1989 - 2003)
Carlos Garfias Merlos (2003 - 2010, appointed Archbishop of Acapulco)
Héctor Luis Morales Sánchez (2011–present)

Territorial losses

External links and references

Netzahualcoyotl
Netzahualcoyotl, Roman Catholic Diocese of
Netzahualcoyotl
Netzahualcoyotl